Oebele Klaas Anne (Oek) de Jong (born 4 October 1952 in Breda) is a Dutch novelist.

He debuted in 1976 with De hemelvaart van Massimo, a collection of short stories for which he received the Reina Prinsen Geerligsprijs.

In 1980 he won the Ferdinand Bordewijk Prijs for his novel Opwaaiende zomerjurken.

References

1952 births
Living people
20th-century Dutch novelists
20th-century Dutch male writers
Dutch male novelists
Ferdinand Bordewijk Prize winners
People from Breda